Chloropterus fiorii is a species of leaf beetle of Libya, described by  in 1965.

References

Eumolpinae
Beetles of North Africa
Beetles described in 1965
Endemic fauna of Libya